Marino Santana Castro (born May 10, 1972) is a former professional pitcher for two years in Major League Baseball. Santana was 26 years old when he made his major league debut on September 4, 1998, with the Detroit Tigers.

Career 
Santana played for the Detroit Tigers and the Boston Red Sox. Santana only played in 11.1 innings in his entire career. He retired in 1999.

References

External links

1972 births
Living people
Bellingham Mariners players
Boston Red Sox players
Detroit Tigers players
Dominican Republic expatriate baseball players in the United States
Jacksonville Suns players
Lancaster JetHawks players

Major League Baseball players from the Dominican Republic
Major League Baseball pitchers
Pawtucket Red Sox players
Riverside Pilots players
Toledo Mud Hens players
Wisconsin Timber Rattlers players